Chlidanotini is a tribe of moths in the family Tortricidae.

Genera 
Archimaga
Auratonota
Branchophantis
Caenognosis
Chlidanota
Diabolo (= Diablo)
Daulocnema
Electracma
Gnaphalostoma
Heppnerographa
Iconostigma
Leurogyia
Macrochlidia
Metrernis
Monortha
Picroxena
Pseudocomotis
Trymalitis
Utrivalva

Previously placed here
Hynhamia

References

 , 2005: World catalogue of insects volume 5 Tortricidae
 , 2010: Tortricidae (Lepidoptera) from Peru. Acta Zoologica Cracoviensia 53B (1-2): 73-159. . Full article:  .

 
Taxa named by Edward Meyrick
Moth tribes